County Louth Golf Club is a links golf course located in the village of Baltray, County Louth in Ireland. It is situated approximately 4 miles from the town of Drogheda.

The Irish Open professional golf tournament which is part of the PGA European Tour has been held there on two occasions, in 2004 and 2009.

The 18-hole course par score is 72 with a course length of 7031 yards.

References

External links
Official Site
World Golf Profile

Golf clubs and courses in the Republic of Ireland
Golf in Leinster
Irish Open (golf) venues
Sports clubs in County Louth
1938 establishments in Ireland
Sports venues completed in 1938